Rachel Allessya Rose (born 30 June 2004) is an Indonesian badminton player. She was part of Indonesia squad that won a bronze medal in the 2022 World Junior Championships and a silver medal in the girls' doubles event.

Career 
In May 2022, Rose and her partner Meilysa Trias Puspita Sari won their first senior title at the Slovenian International.

2023 
In January, Rose and Puspita Sari competed at the home tournament, Indonesia Masters, but had to lose in the first round from American pair Francesca Corbett and Allison Lee. In the next tournament, they lost in the second round of the Thailand Masters from Chinese pair Li Wenmei and Liu Xuanxuan.

Achievements

World Junior Championships 
Girls' doubles

BWF International Challenge/Series (1 title) 
Women's doubles

  BWF International Challenge tournament
  BWF International Series tournament
  BWF Future Series tournament

BWF Junior International (3 titles) 
Girls' doubles

  BWF Junior International Grand Prix tournament
  BWF Junior International Challenge tournament
  BWF Junior International Series tournament
  BWF Junior Future Series tournament

Performance timeline

National team 
 Junior level

Individual competitions

Junior level 
 Girls' doubles

Senior level 
 Women's doubles

References

External links 
 

2004 births
Living people
People from Bogor
Sportspeople from West Java
Indonesian female badminton players
21st-century Indonesian women